These are the results of the women's individual all-around competition, one of six events for female competitors in artistic gymnastics at the 1988 Summer Olympics in Seoul.  The qualification and final rounds took place on September 19, 21 and 23rd at the Olympic Gymnastics Hall.

Results

Qualification

Ninety gymnasts competed in the all-around during the compulsory and optional rounds on September 19 and 21.  The thirty-six highest scoring gymnasts advanced to the final on September 23.  Each country was limited to three competitors in the final.  Half of the points earned by each gymnast during both the compulsory and optional rounds carried over to the final.  This constitutes each gymnast's "prelim" score.

Final

Remaining placings

References

External links
Official Olympic Report
www.gymnasticsresults.com

Women's individual all-around
1988 in women's gymnastics